DZC '68 is an amateur football club from Doetinchem, Netherlands. It was formed on 1 May 1968 and they play their home games at  "Sportpark Zuid". They play in yellow jerseys with blue shorts and blue socks.

In the 2011/2012 season they were relegated from the Eerste Klasse in Dutch amateur football. Two seasons earlier they were promoted to the Eerste Klasse. DZC '68 has produced multiple players who have played professional football. Luuk de Jong, Siem de Jong, Caner Cavlan, Remy Raterink and Cihan Yalcin all have played for DZC '68. Scott Calderwood is a former manager. Joop Doornebosch is an important person for the club and also a former football player of De Graafschap. Siri Worm started her international career on DZC boys' teams.

In 2008 DZC '68 played a match against Aberdeen. The Scottish beat DZC '68 5–0. At the time Jimmy Calderwood was manager of Aberdeen and Scott Calderwood was manager of DZC '68.  In 2010 DZC '68 played their neighbours De Graafschap for the last time, losing 4–0.

References

External links
 DZC '68

Football clubs in the Netherlands
Football clubs in Doetinchem
1968 establishments in the Netherlands
Association football clubs established in 1968